Yusef Khan (also Romanized as Yūsef Khān and Yūsof Khān; also known as Qal‘eh-ye Yūsof and Qal‘eh Yūsuf Khān) is a village in Shirin Darreh Rural District, in the Central District of Quchan County, Razavi Khorasan Province, Iran. At the 2006 census, its population was 415, in 121 families.

References 

Populated places in Quchan County